A cone calorimeter is a device used to study the behaviour of fire of small samples of various materials in their condensed phase. It is widely used in the field of Fire Safety Engineering.

It gathers data regarding the ignition time, mass loss, combustion products, heat release rate and other parameters associated with the sample's burning properties. The principle of the measurement of the heat release rate is based on Huggett's principle that the gross heat of combustion of any organic material is directly related to the amount of oxygen required for combustion. 

Oxygen consumption calorimetry has made the measurement of heat release rate of a fire a routine part of fire testing for both research and for regulatory compliance. Heat release rate is a primary metric of fire energy and has been a phenomenal invention in modern fire protection engineering. The device allows a sample to be exposed to different heat fluxes over its surface.  Its name comes from the conical shape of the radiant heater that produces a nearly uniform heat flux over the surface of the sample under study.

The Cone Calorimeter has long been considered the most significant bench scale instrument in the field of fire testing. This was substantiated in 2016 by the $50,000 DiNenno Prize, which recognized oxygen consumption calorimetry as a significant technical achievement that has had a major impact on public safety. The 2016 Philip J. DiNenno Prize was awarded to Dr. William Parker, who conducted his research on the cone calorimeter at the U.S. National Bureau of Standards. The DiNenno Prize directed ample commendation to his deceased NIST collaborator, Dr. Clayton Huggett. Others who made contributions to the early development and application of oxygen consumption calorimetry include Peter Hinkley, William Christian, Thomas Waterman, Darryl Sensenig, Ralph Krause, Richard Gann, Vyto Babrauskas, Gunnar Heskestad, Norm Alvares, Donald Beason, and Brady Williamson. Fire Testing Technology Limited (FTT) in the UK is currently the largest manufacturer of Cone Calorimeters.

Fire Safety 
A cone calorimeter is also used in fire testing and research. It allows characterization of the fire properties of small samples of materials (approx. 100x100 mm square). The fire characteristics of a material can be determined from several different standard models of the cone calorimeter that can be used to evaluate different aspects of flammable materials. The research using the cone calorimeters can be used for product safety, environment, and health services testing.

This device is important when dealing with safety issues. By using the device, it is easier to see how many different materials react with fire. Knowing that information, safety regulations can be made easily to protect the people that come in contact or work with the material often. It is important to know and understand the flammability, the heat of combustion, ignitability, heat release, and smoke production of many materials in order to maintain a safe environment, all of which can be measured using a calorimeter. The cone calorimeter is a reduced-scale apparatus. Scale effects must be considered when using cone results to predict real-world fires.

Use
Many devices that were used before the invention of the cone calorimeter were known to be very faulty and had several experimental errors. However, research improved with the addition of the cone calorimeter in 1982. Unlike any other apparatus, the cone calorimeter introduced "a system for measuring smoke optically and soot yield gravimetrically". The changes in design allowed for the operation of the device to become much easier and the data more reliable. It is now considered one of the most important devices for fire testing and fire protection engineering, and its usage in research has grown over the years.

The fire calorimeter is used by encasing a small sample in aluminium foil, wool, and a retainer frame that is ignited below an exhaust hood. A conical heater is placed in between in order for materials to combust. The cone-shaped Inconel heating element provides a controllable radiant flux onto the sample, turning electricity into heat not unlike an electric toaster or oven. The flammability of a sample can be characterized as a function of heat flux onto a sample. The conical heater is open in its center, allowing products of combustion to flow upwards into an exhaust duct.

Ventilation is also a very important part of the device, as well as the electrical power to run the conical heater. A small water supply is necessary to cool and regulate the heat in the system of the device. Since temperature and pressure are being evaluated, two different measurement tools are needed in the exhaust tube. Gas samples, smoke measurements, and soot collections are also acquired using this device.

Test standards 
 ASTM E 1354 
 ASTM D 5485
 CAN/ULC-S135
 ISO 5660-1
 NFPA 271

See also
Flammability
Flammability diagram
Fire test
Fire-safe polymers

References

External links
 U.S. National Bureau of Standards "NBS Special Publication 745: User Guide for Cone Calorimeter" 1988
 Cone Calorimeter by Fire Testing Technology Ltd
 Diagram of a cone calorimeter
 Color diagram of a cone calorimeter
 Ten Years of Heat Release Research with the Cone Calorimeter by Dr. Vyto Babrauska of Fire Science and Technology, Inc
 "Cone calorimeter analysis of UL-94 V-rated plastics" Fire Mater. 2007; 31:257–283

Laboratory equipment
Fire prevention
Fire protection
Fire test standards